Graysontown Methodist Church is a historic Methodist church building located near Graysontown, Montgomery County, Virginia.  It was built in 1895, and is a one-story, three-bay, nave plan frame structure clad in weatherboard. It has a two-stage central tower, with bracketed friezes and pyramidal roof.

It was listed on the National Register of Historic Places in 1989.

References

United Methodist churches in Virginia
Churches on the National Register of Historic Places in Virginia
Churches completed in 1895
Churches in Montgomery County, Virginia
National Register of Historic Places in Montgomery County, Virginia